Jóhannes Jóhannesson (17 January 1866 - 7 February 1950)  was an Icelandic politician and speaker of Althing. He was a member of the Althing in 1900–1901, 1903–1913, and 1916–1931.

On 25 August 1907 Jóhannes inaugurated the first submarine cable between Iceland and Europe, and sent the first telegraph after minister Hannes Hafstein was delayed due to bad weather out at sea.

Between the years of 1897-1918 he served as county sheriff for Seyðisfjörður, and from 1918-1928 he served as county sheriff for the city of Reykjavík until the role was dissolved.

Jóhannes served as chairman for the Icelandic side of the committee on the act of the Union with Denmark, which secured the sovereignty of Iceland from Danish rule.

In 1920 he was appointed a member of the first committee of the Fálkaorða receiving the stórriddarakross for his role as county sheriff in 1921.

Photos

References

External links
 Jóhannes Jóhannesson, Secretariat of Althingi, retrieved 22 January 2022
 Leiðin að sjálfstæði (in Icelandic), retrieved 22 January 2022
 Gardur.is (in Icelandic), retrieved 22 January 2022
 Mbl.is (in Icelandic), retrieved 5 September 2022

1866 births
1950 deaths
Jóhannes Jóhannesson
Jóhannes Jóhannesson